This is a list of universities in Saint Pierre and Miquelon.

Universities 
 Institut Frecker (affiliated with the Memorial University of Newfoundland)

See also 
 List of universities by country

References

Universities
Saint Pierre and Miquelon
Saint Pierre and Miquelon